Witoka is an unincorporated community in Winona County, Minnesota, United States.

Geography
The community is located near the junction of Winona County Roads 9, 12, 15, and 17. Interstate 90 and State Highway 76 (MN 76) are nearby.  Witoka is located within Wilson Township and Wiscoy Township. Nearby places include Winona, Wilson, Centerville, and Ridgeway. Cedar Creek, Money Creek, and Pleasant Valley Creek all flow nearby.

History
Witoka was platted in 1855, and named for the daughter of an Indian chief. A post office was established at Witoka in 1857, and remained in operation until 1918.

References

Unincorporated communities in Minnesota
Unincorporated communities in Winona County, Minnesota
1855 establishments in Minnesota Territory
Populated places established in 1855